The 2002 Cheltenham and Gloucester Trophy was an English limited overs county cricket tournament which was held between 29 August 2001 and 31 August 2002.  It was the second Cheltenham & Gloucester Trophy, following its change of name from the NatWest Trophy.  The tournament was won by Yorkshire who defeated Somerset by 6 wickets in the final at Lord's.

Format
The 18 first-class counties, were joined by all twenty Minor Counties, plus Huntingdonshire.  They were also joined by the cricket boards of Derbyshire, Durham, Essex, Gloucestershire, Hampshire, Kent, Lancashire, Leicestershire, Middlesex, Northamptonshire, Nottinghamshire, Somerset, Surrey, Sussex, Warwickshire, Worcestershire and Yorkshire.  The national teams of Denmark, Ireland, the Netherlands and Scotland returned to the competition after being unable to take part in the previous competition due to international commitments in the 2001 ICC Trophy.

The tournament was a knockout with four rounds before the quarter-final and semi-final stages. The first and second rounds, which did not involve the first-class counties, were played at the end of the 2001 season to allow more room in the 2002 schedule.  The winners of the semi-finals went on to the final at Lord's which was held on 31 August 2002.

First round

Second round

Third round

Fourth round

Quarter-finals

Semi-finals

Final

References

External links
CricketArchive tournament page for 2001 rounds 
CricketArchive tournament page for 2002 rounds 

Friends Provident Trophy seasons
Cheltenham and Amp Gloucester Trophy, 2002